Bruchiaceae is a family of haplolepideous mosses (Dicranidae) in the order Dicranales. They have the greatest occurrence in temperate regions.
They are mosses with long-necked, cleistocarpous (having the capsule opening irregularly without an operculum) capsules and mitrate calyptras.

History
Viktor Ferdinand Brotherus (in 1909) included Bruchia and Trematodon in the family Dicranaceae (part of subfamily Trematodontoideae). Nathaniel Lord Britton (in 1913) placed these two genera together with Pringleella in the family Bruchiaceae. Dale Hadley Vitt (in 1984) included Bruchia, Eobruchia and Trematodon in the family Dicranaceae, but Pringleella and Wilsoniella were in the Ditrichacea family. Spore studies have been carried in order to establish phylogenetic relationships (Blackmore & Barnes 1987).

In 1979, it had 4 genera; Bruchia, Pringleella, Eobruchia, and Trematodon.

Genera within the family include:
 Bruchia
 Cladophascum
 Eobruchia
 Pringleella
 Trematodon

2 genera; (Bruchia  and Trematodon  ) with 16 species in the flora are found in North America. 9 species of the family Bruchiaceae exist in Brazil.

References

External links

Dicranales
Moss families